Koninklijke Maatschappij Torhout is a Belgian football club currently playing in the third division A. The club is based in Torhout, West Flanders and plays their home meets in stadium "De Velodroom". KM Torhout was founded by a merger of two associations, namely the KVK Torhout and KSK Torhout.

Club history
 1920: Founding of FC (Football Club) Torhout, later KFC (Koninklijke Football Club) Torhout and ultimately KVK (Koninklijke Voetbal Klub) Torhout. Became member of the Koninlijke Belgische Voetbal Bond (KBVB)(Royal Belgium Football Association)
 1926: Founding of SK (Sportkring) Torhout, later KSK (Konionklijke Sportkring) Torhout. This club also became a member of the KBVB.
 1992: Merger of KVK Torhout with SK Torhout to form Torhout 1992 KM
 2001: Founding of the New SK Torhout, in 2002 renamed to SK Torhout, as a separate member of the KBVB
 2020: The club changed its name to KM Torhout

Current squad
''

References

External links
  Official club website

Association football clubs established in 1920
Football clubs in Belgium
Organisations based in Belgium with royal patronage
Torhout